The Bavispe sucker, in Mexican matalote del Bavispe (Catostomus leopoldi), is a species of ray-finned fish in the family Catostomidae.
It is found only in Mexico.

The fish is named in honor of the ecologist, environmentalist and author Aldo Leopold (1887-1948).

References

Sources 

Catostomus
Freshwater fish of Mexico
Taxa named by Darrell J. Siebert
Taxa named by Wendell L. Minckley
Fish described in 1986
Taxonomy articles created by Polbot